Leeuwin (Dutch for "lioness") may refer to:

Places

 Cape Leeuwin, the most south-westerly point of Australia
 Leeuwin-Naturaliste National Park, the national park in which Cape Leeuwin is located
 Leeuwin Barracks, formerly HMAS Leeuwin (naval base), a Royal Australian Navy shore base in North Fremantle

Ships

 Leeuwin (galleon), Dutch galleon that encountered south-west Australia in 1622
 HMAS Leeuwin (A 245), a hydrographic survey ship
 Leeuwin class survey vessel, the class of HMAS Leeuwin
 STS Leeuwin II, a Western Australian sail training ship

Other uses

 Leeuwin Current, a warm ocean current flowing down the west coast of Australia
 Leeuwin triplefin (Norfolkia leeuwin), a species of small fish of the family Tripterygiidae
 Leeuwin (journal), a short-lived literary journal published in Western Australia by Willem Siebenhaar in 1910
 Leeuwin Estate, a winery in Margaret River, Western Australia
 Leeuwin Estate Concert Series, an annual open-air event featuring international and Australian performers at Leeuwin Estate Winery